peopleWatching is a Canadian animated web series, which premiered in 2017. Created by Winston Rowntree, the series follows a group of people in their early 30s in various scenarios depicting Rowntree's humorous observations on the absurdities of modern life.

The show's voice cast includes Natalia Bushnik, Frank Phillips, Hannan Younis, Jon Blair, Bracken Burns, Andrew Knobbs, Ermina Perez, Frederick Gietz, Kate Conway and Chantale Renee.

The series was distributed in the United States on Cracked.com, and in Canada on CBC Gem.

The series won the Canadian Screen Award for Best Original Digital Program or Series, Fiction at the 6th Canadian Screen Awards in 2018. In the same year, Hannan Younis received a nomination for Best Actress in a Web Program or Series. At the 7th Canadian Screen Awards in 2019, Rowntree was nominated for Best Writing in a Web Program or Series.

References

2017 Canadian television series debuts
2017 web series debuts
Canadian animated web series
Canadian comedy web series
CBC Gem original programming